Ellen Githmark is a former Norwegian curler.

At the national level, she is a three-time Norwegian women's champion curler (1979, 1980, 1984).

Teams

References

External links

Living people
Sportspeople from Oslo
Norwegian female curlers
Norwegian curling champions
Year of birth missing (living people)
Place of birth missing (living people)